The 1997 UEFA Cup Winners' Cup Final was a football match contested between Barcelona of Spain and the cup holders Paris Saint-Germain of France, to determine the winner of the 1996–97 UEFA Cup Winners' Cup and the 37th overall Cup Winners' Cup final. It was held at Feijenoord Stadion in Rotterdam on 14 May 1997. Barcelona won the match 1–0 thanks to a Ronaldo penalty. The final saw the last instance of the Cup Winners' Cup "jinx" that no club had successfully retained the cup in successive seasons — with Paris Saint-Germain failing to defend the trophy that they won in 1996.

Route to the final

Match

Details

See also
1996–97 UEFA Cup Winners' Cup
1997 UEFA Champions League Final
1997 UEFA Cup Final
1997 UEFA Super Cup
FC Barcelona in international football competitions
Paris Saint-Germain F.C. in European football

References

External links
UEFA Cup Winners' Cup results at Rec.Sport.Soccer Statistics Foundation

3
Cup Winners' Cup Final 1997
Cup Winners' Cup Final 1997
Cup Winners' Cup Final 1997
1997
Cup Winners' Cup Final
Cup Winners' Cup Final
Cup Winners' Cup Final
May 1997 sports events in Europe
Sports competitions in Rotterdam
20th century in Rotterdam